In computer science, the Aho–Corasick algorithm is a string-searching algorithm invented by Alfred V. Aho and Margaret J. Corasick in 1975. It is a kind of dictionary-matching algorithm that locates elements of a finite set of strings (the "dictionary") within an input text. It matches all strings simultaneously. The complexity of the algorithm is linear in the length of the strings plus the length of the searched text plus the number of output matches.

Informally, the algorithm constructs a finite-state machine that resembles a trie with additional links between the various internal nodes. This allows the automaton to transition between string matches without the need for backtracking.  

When the string dictionary is known in advance (e.g. a computer virus database), the construction of the automaton can be performed once off-line and the compiled automaton stored for later use.  In this case, its run time is linear in the length of the input plus the number of matched entries.

The Aho–Corasick string-matching algorithm formed the basis of the original Unix command fgrep.

Example
In this example, we will consider a dictionary consisting of the following words: {a, ab, bab, bc, bca, c, caa}.

The graph below is the Aho–Corasick data structure constructed from the specified dictionary, with each row in the table representing a node in the trie, with the column path indicating the (unique) sequence of characters from the root to the node.

The data structure has one node for every prefix of every string in the dictionary. If a node is in the dictionary then it is a blue node. Otherwise it is a grey node.

There is a black directed "child" arc from each node to a node whose name is found by appending one character.  So there is a black arc from (bc) to (bca).

There is a blue directed "suffix" arc from each node to the node that is the longest possible strict suffix of it in the graph. The longest of these that exists in the graph is (a). So there is a blue arc from (caa) to (a). The blue arcs can be computed in linear time by performing a breadth-first search [potential suffix node will always be at lower level] starting from the root. The target for the blue arc of a visited node can be found by following its parent's blue arc to its longest suffix node and searching for a child of the suffix node whose character matches that of the visited node. If the character does not exist as a child, we can find the next longest suffix (following the blue arc again) and then search for the character. We can do this until we either find the character (as child of a node) or we reach the root (which will always be a suffix of every string).

There is a green "dictionary suffix" arc from each node to the next node in the dictionary that can be reached by following blue arcs.  For example, there is a green arc from (bca) to (a) because (a) is the first node in the dictionary (i.e. a blue node) that is reached when following the blue arcs to (ca) and then on to (a).  The green arcs can be computed in linear time by repeatedly traversing blue arcs until a blue node is found, and memoizing this information.

At each step, the current node is extended by finding its child,
and if that doesn't exist, finding its suffix's child, and if
that doesn't work, finding its suffix's suffix's child, and so on, finally
ending in the root node if nothing's seen before.

When the algorithm reaches a node, it outputs all the dictionary
entries that end at the current character position in the input text.  This is done
by printing every node reached by following the dictionary suffix links, starting
from that node, and continuing until it reaches a node with no dictionary suffix link.
In addition, the node itself is printed, if it is a dictionary entry.

Execution on input string  yields the following steps:

Dynamic search list

The original Aho-Corasick algorithm assumes that the set of search strings is fixed. It does not directly apply to applications in which new search strings are added during application of the algorithm. An example is an interactive indexing program, in which the user goes through the text and highlights new words or phrases to index as they see them. Bertrand Meyer introduced an incremental version of the algorithm in which the search string set can be incrementally extended during the search, retaining the algorithmic complexity of the original.

See also 
 Commentz-Walter algorithm

References

External links

 Aho-Corasick in NIST's Dictionary of Algorithms and Data Structures (2019-07-15)

String matching algorithms